Deborah Kara Unger (born 12 May 1966) is a Canadian actress. She is known for her roles in the films Highlander III: The Sorcerer (1994), Crash (1996), The Game (1997), Payback (1999), The Hurricane (1999), White Noise (2005), Silent Hill (2006), 88 Minutes (2008) and The Way (2010).

Early life
Deborah Kara Unger was born in Vancouver, British Columbia, Canada to a nuclear disposal specialist mother and a gynaecologist father. She was the first Canadian to be accepted into Australia's National Institute of Dramatic Art.

Career
Upon graduation Unger found steady work in Australian films and television series, including Bangkok Hilton with Nicole Kidman. Following her return to North America in the early 1990s she appeared in David Lynch's 1993 HBO mini-series Hotel Room, and a year later appeared in Highlander III: The Sorcerer opposite Christopher Lambert.

Unger's breakthrough role came in David Cronenberg's 1996 erotic drama Crash, about a group of people who take sexual pleasure from car accidents, a notable form of paraphilia. Unger followed up her performance in Crash by starring with Michael Douglas in the psychological thriller The Game, directed by David Fincher. In 1998 she played Ava Gardner in HBO's The Rat Pack, and in 1999 she appeared in Payback with Mel Gibson, The Hurricane with Denzel Washington and the award-winning ensemble drama Sunshine.

Unger appeared in many independent films in the early 2000s, such as Signs and Wonders, Ten Tiny Love Stories, Fear X, Thirteen, Stander, Hollywood North, Emile, Paranoia 1.0 and A Love Song for Bobby Long. She played a leading role opposite Sophia Loren and Mira Sorvino in the 2002 independent movie Between Strangers, about three women who confront their pasts which changes their futures, for which she was nominated on Genie Award for Best Performance by an Actress in a Leading Role.

From 2005 to 2010, Unger appeared in White Noise, Things That Hang from Trees, The Alibi, Silent Hill, 88 Minutes, Walled In, Messages Deleted and The Way.  She also appeared in the music video for "Jesus of Suburbia" by American rock band Green Day. In 2011 she took a starring role in the television series Combat Hospital, and in 2012 reprised her role as Dahlia Gillespie in the horror film sequel Silent Hill: Revelation.

Filmography

Film

Television

Video games

Music videos

Awards and nominations

References

External links

 Interview with Deborah Kara Unger on Eurochannel

1966 births
Canadian film actresses
Canadian television actresses
Living people
Actresses from Vancouver
20th-century Canadian actresses
21st-century Canadian actresses